Spurilla faustina is a rare species of sea slug, an aeolid nudibranch, a marine gastropod mollusk in the family Aeolidiidae.

References

 Powell A. W. B., New Zealand Mollusca, William Collins Publishers Ltd, Auckland, New Zealand 1979 
 Spencer H.G., Willan R.C., Marshall B.A. & Murray T.J. (2011) Checklist of the Recent Mollusca Recorded from the New Zealand Exclusive Economic Zone
 Sea Slug Forum

Aeolidiidae
Gastropods of Australia
Gastropods of New Zealand
Gastropods described in 1900